KMUN (91.9 FM) and KCPB-FM (90.9 FM) are National Public Radio member radio stations in Astoria, Oregon.

Repeaters
 KTCB at 89.5 FM, Tillamook

See also
List of community radio stations in the United States

External links
KMUN official website

NPR member stations
Astoria, Oregon
MUN
Community radio stations in the United States